Vladimir Nikolayevich Laptev (born November 26, 1945) is the Head of the Administration of Noginsky District, Moscow Oblast, Russia.

References

21st-century Russian politicians
Living people
1945 births
People from Noginsky District
Place of birth missing (living people)